Um Tweineh  is a Syrian village located in Salamiyah Subdistrict in Salamiyah District, Hama.  According to the Syria Central Bureau of Statistics (CBS), Um Tweineh had a population of 566 in the 2004 census.

References 

Populated places in Salamiyah District